Granin (chromogranin and secretogranin) is a protein family of regulated secretory proteins ubiquitously found in the cores of amine and peptide hormone and neurotransmitter dense-core secretory vesicles.

Function 
Granins (chromogranins or secretogranins) are acidic proteins and are present in the secretory granules of a wide variety of endocrine and neuro-endocrine cells. The exact function(s) of these proteins is not yet settled but there is evidence that granins function as pro-hormones, giving rise to an array of peptide fragments for which autocrine, paracrine, and endocrine activities have been demonstrated in vitro and in vivo.  The intracellular biochemistry of granins includes binding of Ca2+, ATP and catecholamines (epinephrine, norepinephrine) within the hormone storage vesicle core.  There is also evidence that CgA, and perhaps other granins, regulate the biogenesis of dense-core secretory vesicles and hormone sequestration in neuroendocrine cells.

Structure 

Apart from their subcellular location and the abundance of acidic residues (Asp and Glu), these proteins do not share many structural similarities. Only one short region, located in the C-terminal section, is conserved in all these proteins. Chromogranins and secretogranins together share a C-terminal motif, whereas chromogranins A and B share a region of high similarity in their N-terminal section; this region includes two cysteine residues involved in a disulfide bond.

There are considerable differences in the amino acid composition between different animals. Commercial assays for measuring human CGA can usually not be used for measuring CGA in samples from other species. Some specific parts of the molecule have a higher degree of amino acid homology and methods where the antibodies are directed against specific epitopes can be used to measure samples from different animals. Region-specific assays measuring defined parts of CGA, CGB and SG2 can be used for measurements in samples from cats and dogs.

Members

Chromogranins 

 chromogranin A (CgA)
 chromogranin B (CgB)

Secretogranins 

 secretogranin II (SgII) (see also secretoneurin)
 secretogranin III (SgIII)
 secretogranin V (SgV)

Extended group 
Some other proteins are also proposed to belong to the granins based on their physico-chemical properties. These include NESP55 (SgVI), VGF (SgVII), and ProSAAS (SgVIII).

References

External links 
 

Protein structural motifs